Wooden bullets are wooden projectiles designed to be fired from a gun. They are intended to be used as less lethal weapons for crowd control by enforcing pain compliance at a distance. They have been known to raise large welts or bruises on their targets.

History of use
During the Second World War, some German troops were equipped with wooden bullets, while British troops were trained with wooden bullets to avoid the cost of metal bullets.

Wooden bullets were also used by British troops in Hong Kong. During a 2014 protest in Missouri following the shooting of Michael Brown, the police fired wooden bullets at protesters. During the 1999 WTO anti-globalization movement in Seattle, the police shot wooden bullets at protesters.

See also
 Bean bag round
 Plastic bullet
 Rubber bullet

References 
 

Bullets
Non-lethal projectiles
Riot control weapons
Wood products